The 1997 Major League Baseball postseason was the playoff tournament of Major League Baseball for the 1997 season. The winners of the League Division Series would move on to the League Championship Series to determine the pennant winners that face each other in the World Series. 

In the American League, the New York Yankees and Cleveland Indians returned to the postseason for the third year in a row, the Baltimore Orioles returned to the postseason for the second straight year (which would be their last until 2012), and the Seattle Mariners returned to the postseason for the second time in three years. 

In the National League, the Atlanta Braves made their sixth straight postseason appearance, the Houston Astros made their first postseason appearance since 1986, the Florida Marlins made their first postseason appearance four years into their existence, and the San Francisco Giants returned to the postseason for the first time since 1989.

The postseason began on September 30, 1997, and ended on October 26, 1997, with the Marlins defeating the Indians in seven games in the 1997 World Series. It was the Marlins' first championship in franchise history.

Playoff seeds
The following teams qualified for the postseason:

American League
 Baltimore Orioles - 98–64, Clinched AL East
 Cleveland Indians - 86–75, Clinched AL Central
 Seattle Mariners - 90–72, Clinched AL West
 New York Yankees - 96–66, Clinched Wild Card

Home-field advantage priority order: East, Central, West

National League
 Atlanta Braves - 101–61, Clinched NL East
 Houston Astros - 84–78, Clinched NL Central
 San Francisco Giants - 90–72, Clinched NL West
 Florida Marlins - 92–70, Clinched Wild Card

Home-field advantage priority order: West, Central, East

Playoff bracket

American League Division Series

Baltimore Orioles vs. Seattle Mariners

The Orioles defeated the Mariners in four games to return to the ALCS for the second straight year. In Seattle, the Orioles blew out the Mariners in Games 1 and 2 to go up 2-0 in the series heading back to Baltimore. While the Mariners avoided a sweep in Game 3, they would be eliminated in Game 4 by two runs as the Orioles advanced to the ALCS.

This would be the last playoff series win by the Orioles until 2014, as well as their last postseason appearance until 2012. The Mariners would return to the postseason in 2000, defeating the Chicago White Sox in the ALDS before falling to the New York Yankees in the ALCS.

The 1997 ALDS was the last postseason series ever played at the Kingdome.

Cleveland Indians vs. New York Yankees

This was the first postseason appearance between the Yankees and Indians. The Indians knocked out the defending World Series champion Yankees in five games to return to the ALCS for the second time in three years.

The Yankees and Indians would meet again in the post season five more times - in the 1998 ALCS (won by the Yankees), the 2007 ALDS (won by the Indians), the 2017 ALDS (won by the Yankees), the 2020 AL Wild Card Series (won by the Yankees), and the 2022 ALDS (won by the Yankees).

National League Division Series

San Francisco Giants vs. Florida Marlins

This was the first postseason meeting between the Marlins and Giants. The Marlins swept the Giants to advance to the NLCS for the first time in franchise history. In Miami, the Marlins narrowly took the first two games by one run to go up 2-0 in the series headed to San Francisco. In Game 3, the Marlins won by four runs to close out the series.

The Giants would return to the postseason in 2000, but lost to the New York Mets in the NLDS. Both teams would meet again in the NLDS in 2003, which was also won by the Marlins.

Game 3 of the 1997 NLDS was the last postseason game ever played at Candlestick Park.

Houston Astros vs. Atlanta Braves

This was the first postseason meeting between the Braves and Astros. The Braves swept the Astros to return to the NLCS for the sixth year in a row. The Astros were held to only five runs scored throughout the entire series, as the Braves narrowly took Game 1, blew out the Astros in Game 2, and then closed out the series in Houston in Game 3.

The Braves and Astros would meet in the NLDS four more times - in 1999, 2001 (Braves won both), 2004, and 2005 (both won by the Astros). They would also meet in the 2021 World Series, which the Braves won in six games.

American League Championship Series

Baltimore Orioles vs. Cleveland Indians

This was the second straight postseason meeting between the Indians and Orioles. The Indians defeated the Orioles in six games to return to the World Series for the second time in three years. 

Both teams split the first two games in Baltimore. The Indians took Game 3 after 12 innings of play, and prevailed in a slugfest in Game 4, 8-7, to go up 3-1 in the series. The Orioles took Game 5 to send the series back to Baltimore. Game 6 remained scoreless after 10 innings of play until Cleveland's Tony Fernández hit a solo home run to put the Indians in the lead for good, effectively securing the pennant.  

This would be the last time the Indians won the AL pennant until 2016, where they defeated the Toronto Blue Jays in six games before falling in the World Series. This was the last time the Orioles appeared in the postseason until 2012. The Orioles would not return to the ALCS again until 2014, where they were swept by the Kansas City Royals.

National League Championship Series

Atlanta Braves vs. Florida Marlins

The Marlins defeated the two-time defending National League champion Braves to advance to their first World Series in franchise history, becoming the first team from Florida to accomplish such a feat.

The Marlins stole Game 1 on the road by two runs, while in Game 2, the Braves blew out the Marlins thanks to an excellent pitching performance from Tom Glavine, who only gave up one run after nearly 8 innings of play. When the series moved to Miami, the Marlins took Game 3 by three runs, while Atlanta's Denny Neagle pitched a complete game shutout to help the Braves even the series at two. Game 5 was marred by controversy as Florida's Liván Hernández was given an unusually wide strike zone by umpire Eric Gregg. Gregg seemed to expand the strike zone as the game went on. It also seemed to be wider off the plate to left-handed hitters than it was to right-handed hitters, and while this was consistently the case with both teams, it disproportionately affected Atlanta due to them having six left-handers in their lineup to Florida's three. It was picked as the third-worst called game from 1975–2000 by Baseball America. Hernández ended up pitching a complete game, striking out 15 batters, allowing only three runs and one hit as the Marlins won 2-1 to go up 3-2 in the series headed back to Atlanta. The Marlins won Game 6 by three runs to clinch the pennant.

The Braves returned to the NLCS the next year, but they lost to the San Diego Padres in six games. Their next pennant would come in 1999, against the New York Mets. The Marlins would win their next NL pennant in 2003, where they overcame a 3 games to 1 series deficit against the Chicago Cubs as a result of the Steve Bartman incident.

1997 World Series

Cleveland Indians (AL) vs. Florida Marlins (NL) 

This was the first World Series to ever be played in the state of Florida. In what many consider to be one of the greatest World Series ever played, the Marlins knocked off the Indians in a back-and-forth seven game series to win their first ever championship. 

In Miami, both teams split the first two games. In Cleveland for Game 3, the Marlins prevailed in an offensive duel, 14-11, to take a 2-1 series lead. In a cold and snowy Game 4, the Indians blew out the Marlins thanks to solid pitching performances from Jaret Wright and closer Brian Anderson to even the series at two. Game 4's official gametime temperature of 35 °F (3.3 °C) still stands as the coldest in World Series history, with media outlets reporting wind chill readings as low as 18 °F (−7.8 °C). Game 5 was another offensive duel, which was won by the Marlins by an 8-7 score to go up 3-2 in the series headed back to Miami. The Indians would win Game 6 by a 4-1 score to force a seventh game. In Game 7, the Indians held a 2-1 lead in the bottom of the ninth and were two outs away from winning the World Series, but closer José Mesa was unable to hold the lead, as the Marlins tied the game. The game went scoreless throughout the tenth, and then in the eleventh inning, the series was capped off by Edgar Rentería hitting a hard line drive back up the middle of the infield. The ball hit off Charles Nagy’s glove and rolled into center field, scoring Craig Counsell and winning the series for the Marlins. 

The Marlins' World Series title was the first championship won by a team from the Miami metropolitan area since 1974, when the Miami Dolphins won Super Bowl VIII. The Marlins would win the World Series again in 2003, where they defeated the New York Yankees in six games. At the time, the Marlins became the quickest expansion team and the first ever wild card-quailfied team to reach (and win) the World Series, as they won it in their fifth season in existence. The Arizona Diamondbacks then became the quickest to reach and win the World Series, as they did it in their fourth year in 2001.

The Indians would not return to the World Series again until 2016, where they blew a 3-1 series lead to the Chicago Cubs, who won their first title in 108 years.

References

External links
 League Baseball Standings & Expanded Standings - 1997

 
Major League Baseball postseason